The 2011 Bauchi State gubernatorial election was the 7th gubernatorial election of Bauchi State. Held on April 28, 2011, the People's Democratic Party nominee Isa Yuguda won the election, defeating Yusuf Tuggar of the Congress for Progressive Change.

Results 
A total of 12 candidates contested in the election. Isa Yuguda from the People's Democratic Party won the election, defeating Yusuf Tuggar from the Congress for Progressive Change. Valid votes was 1,273,667.

References 

Bauchi State gubernatorial elections
Bauchi gubernatorial
Bauchi State gubernatorial election